Men's 90 kg competition in judo at the 2000 Summer Olympics was held on 20 September at the Sydney Convention and Exhibition Centre.

This event was the third-heaviest of the men's judo weight classes, limiting competitors to a maximum of 90 kilograms of body mass. Like all other judo events, bouts lasted five minutes. If the bout was still tied at the end, it was extended for another five-minute, sudden-death period; if neither judoka scored during that period, the match is decided by the judges. The tournament bracket consisted of a single-elimination contest culminating in a gold medal match. There was also a repechage to determine the winners of the two bronze medals. Each judoka who had lost to a semifinalist competed in the repechage. The two judokas who lost in the semifinals faced the winner of the opposite half of the bracket's repechage in bronze medal bouts.

Schedule 
All times are Australian Eastern Daylight Time (UTC+11:00)

Tournament results

Final

Mat 1

Mat 2

Repechage
The losing semifinalists as well as those judoka eliminated in earlier rounds by the four semifinalists of the main bracket advanced to the repechage.  These matches determined the two bronze medalists for the event.

References

External links
Official report

Men's 090 kg
Judo at the Summer Olympics Men's Middleweight
Men's events at the 2000 Summer Olympics